Events in the year 2017 in the Dominican Republic.

Incumbents
 President: Danilo Medina
 Vice President: Margarita Cedeño de Fernández

Events

Deaths

22 January – Andy Marte, baseball player (b. 1983).
22 January – Yordano Ventura, baseball player (b. 1991).

5 June – Héctor Wagner, baseball player (b. 1968)

References

 
Years of the 21st century in the Dominican Republic
Dominican Republic
Dominican Republic